The Kerala Film Critics Association Award for Best Music Director is one of the annual awards given at the Kerala Film Critics Association Awards, honouring the best in Malayalam cinema.

Superlatives

Winners

See also
 Kerala Film Critics Association Award for Best Female Playback Singer
 Kerala Film Critics Association Award for Best Male Playback Singer

References

Music Director
Film awards for Best Music Director
Indian music awards
India music-related lists
Film music awards